The House of Reitzenstein was an old German noble family of Franconian knights. It belonged to Franconian Uradel.

History 
First appeared in written documents from 1318, the House of Reitzenstein took its name from Reitzenstein near Issigau. The family was directly related to the House of Sparneck. Members of the family held the title of Baron.

Notable members 
 Franziska von Reitzenstein aka Franz von Nemmersdorf (1834–1896), German novelist
 Hans Albin Freiherr von Reitzenstein, German Obersturmbannführer
 Richard August Reitzenstein (1861–1931), German classical philologist and scholar of Ancient Greek religion, hermetism and Gnosticism
 Sigismund von Reitzenstein (1766-1847), minister and ambassador for Baden.

German noble families
Franconian nobility